Sharon Ellen Burtman (born 1968) is an American chess player.  Her titles include National Master (1994); Woman International Master (1989); New England Women's Champion (1988); and United States Women's Champion (1995, shared with Anjelina Belakovskaia).

Burtman has twice represented the United States in the Interzonal tournaments (1990 and 1995).

In team competition, she was captain of the Rhode Island College chess team, leading them to the Best College prize at each U.S. Amateur Team Championship (East) from 1987 through 1991.  Burtman was also a member of the "Censure Countergambit" team, which won the U.S. Amateur Team Championship (West) in 1999.

References

External links 
 
 
 
 
 Woman International Master Sharon Burtman bio at the USCF website

1968 births
Living people
American female chess players
Chess Woman International Masters
Place of birth missing (living people)
Rhode Island College alumni
21st-century American women